Aeonium glutinosum is a species of flowering plant in the family Crassulaceae endemic to Madeira, Portugal. It has fairly thick leaves and its appearance varies depending on its growing conditions. One characteristic is the very sticky stem of the inflorescence. The main flower is shown but small stalks with flowers continue to appear for several months.

Description
It is a very viscous perennial sub-shrub, with a robust stem, branches up to  decumbent or ascending, occasionally subsessile plants. Leaves up to  yellowish-green, usually with brownish stripes near the apex glabrous, ciliated margins with few or numerous thin single-celled hairs. Inflorescences very loose, remotely branched, up to  Petals , golden yellow, usually with red stripes abaxially.

Distribution
The species is endemic to Madeira Island and Deserta Grande Island part of the Madeira Archipelago.

Gallery

References

glutinosum